Ranco Lake is located in Ranco Province of Chile. It is the largest lake of Los Ríos Region and the fourth largest in Chile. Administratively Ranco Lake is split into three communes; La Unión, Futrono and Lago Ranco. The lake hosts a series of islands, of which Huapi Island is the largest. Illeifa Island is owned by the affluent Edwards family. The western half of the lake is roughly circular while the eastern part features deep embayments. Geographically the lake lies in the Andean precordillera, the zone between the Chilean Central Valley and the Andes.

The lake difers from other large lakes north and south of it by lacking a clearly visible large volcano in its surroundings. 

During the Miocene the lake depression was connected to the Pacific Ocean as an embayment of it. During this period a series of marine fossil bearing sediments known as Estratos de Lago Ranco were deposited in the lake area. During the quaternary glaciations the lake depression was covered by a large glacier lobe of the Patagonian Ice Sheet which left semicircular moraines around the lake's western shore.

References

External links 

Ranco
Lakes of Los Ríos Region